Jules Guéron (2 June 1907 – 11 October 1990) was a French physical chemist and atomic scientist who played a key role in the development of atomic  energy in France.

Biography

Early life
Guéron was educated at Lycée Charlemagne in Paris (1913-1924).
He graduated with the "baccalauréat" (high school degree) in Latin, Sciences and Mathematics. 
From 1926 to 1935 he studied at the University of Paris-Sorbonne in Prof. Marcel Guichard's laboratory, earning a doctorate in physical sciences for which he was awarded the Adrian prize of the French Society of Chemistry.

In 1938 Guéron was appointed lecturer at the University of Strasbourg. He married Geneviève Bernheim in 1934 and had three sons (Maurice, Henri and Frédéric).

World War II
Responding to the historic call for resistance of General Charles de Gaulle, Guéron made his way to Great Britain in June 1940. He enlisted in the Free French Forces and was at first assigned to the Service technique de l'Armement. In December 1941 he was transferred to the Anglo-Canadian Atomic Energy Project, known as "Tube Alloys", at the Cavendish Laboratory in Cambridge.

In 1943 Guéron moved to Montreal as a member of the Tube Alloys team, which at this point also included the French scientists Halban, Auger, Goldschmidt, and Kowarski. 
Work at Tube Alloys did not always proceed smoothly. Most notable was a lengthy interruption of the collaboration with the (American) Manhattan project which lasted until the August 1943 Quebec agreement between Winston Churchill and Franklin D. Roosevelt. The French scientists had their own concerns. Some were highly critical of de Gaulle's constant opposition to the United States, and they imagined that he might reconsider if made aware of this specific and significant instance of America's awesome strength. In this spirit, when General de Gaulle visited Ottawa on 11 July 1944, Guéron personally imparted his near certainty that within one year the US would master a highly powerful weapon: "une bombe, une ville."

A career in atomic energy
In 1945, the French government  established the  Atomic Energy Commission (CEA) with the charter of exploring atomic energy.  
Guéron was nominated Head of the  Chemistry unit. In 1951 he became the first director of the CEA's nuclear research center in Saclay.

In 1958 Guéron was recruited by the European Atomic Energy Community (Euratom) 
as General Director of Research and Education (1958–1968).

From 1969 to 1976 Guéron was a professor at the University of Paris-Sud. 
Concurrently, he consulted for Framatome, 
the firm responsible for building the vast park of French electricity-producing nuclear reactors.

He  also served as Secretary of the International Commission on Atomic Weights 
(1960–1969). He is the author of several books and of many articles on atomic energy. 
He was made "Officier de la Légion d'honneur".

Bibliography

References

External links
 'The private archives' of Jules Guéron are at the Historical Archives of the European Union.

1907 births
1990 deaths
Recipients of the Legion of Honour
People from Tunis
French nuclear physicists
Manhattan Project people